Sphenomorphus dekkerae  is a species of skink found in Indonesia.

References

dekkerae
Reptiles described in 2017
Taxa named by Glenn Michael Shea
Skinks of New Guinea